The 5th edition of the Men's FINA World Water Polo Development Trophy was held in Tehran, Iran from May 24 to May 29, 2015.

Format
10 teams qualified for the 2015 FINA World Water Polo Development Trophy. They were split into two groups of 4 teams. After playing a Round-robin, the best ranked team of Group A plays against the best ranked team of Group B for the title, the second ranked team of Group A against the second ranked team of Group B for the 3rd place. The third ranked team of Group A against the third ranked team of Group B for the 5th place, the fourth ranked team of Group A against the fourth ranked team of Group B for the 7th place, and finally, the fifth ranked team of Group A against the fifth ranked team of Group B for the 9th and 10th place respectively.

Groups

Preliminary round

Group A

Group B

Knockout stage

9th place game

7th place game

5th place game

3rd place game

Final

Final standings

References

External links
Official site

FINA World Water Polo Development Trophy
F
W
International water polo competitions hosted by Iran